David Snow may refer to:

 David Snow (ornithologist) (1924–2009), English ornithologist
 David Snow (composer) (born 1954), American composer
 David A. Snow, professor of sociology
 David Snow (American football) (born 1989), American football offensive lineman
 David B. Snow Jr. (born 1954), American business executive
 Dave Snow, American college baseball coach